Harold Jarvis (born December 27, 1864, Toronto; died April 1, 1924, Detroit) was a concert tenor who performed regularly in Canada and the United States, and who taught in Detroit during the 1890s. He began his professional life as a sailor, reaching the rank of officer with the Peninsular and Oriental Steam Navigation Company and also served in the Royal Naval Reserve. He later studied music at the London Academy of Music. Professionally he was known for his teaching, his ballad singing, and performances in oratorios. He recorded for Victor in 1908 and 1911.

References

1864 births
1924 deaths
Musicians from Detroit
Musicians from Toronto
Tenors
Royal Naval Reserve personnel
Victor Records artists